Coprolalia is involuntary swearing or the involuntary utterance of obscene words or socially inappropriate and derogatory remarks.

Coprolalia is an occasional characteristic of tic disorders, in particular Tourette syndrome, although it is not required for a diagnosis of Tourette's and only about 10% of Tourette's patients exhibit coprolalia. It is not unique to tic disorders; it is also a rare symptom of other neurological disorders.

Coprolalia is one type of coprophenomenon. Other coprophenomena include the related symptoms of copropraxia, involuntary actions such as performing obscene or forbidden gestures, and coprographia, making obscene writings or drawings.

Characteristics
Coprolalia encompasses words and phrases that are culturally taboo or generally unsuitable for acceptable social use, when used out of context. The term is not used to describe contextual swearing. It is usually expressed out of social or emotional context, and may be spoken in a louder tone or different cadence or pitch than normal conversation. It can be a single word, or complex phrases. A person with coprolalia may repeat the word mentally rather than saying it out loud; these subvocalizations can be very distressing.

Coprolalia is an occasional characteristic of Tourette syndrome, although it is not required for a diagnosis of Tourette's. In Tourette syndrome, compulsive swearing can be uncontrollable and undesired by the person uttering the phrases. Involuntary outbursts, such as racial or ethnic slurs in the company of those most offended by such remarks, can be particularly embarrassing. The phrases uttered by a person with coprolalia do not necessarily reflect the thoughts or opinions of the person.

Cases of deaf Tourette patients swearing in sign language have been described.

Coprolalia is not unique to tic disorders; it is also a rare symptom of other neurological disorders.  It may occur after injuries to the brain such as stroke and encephalitis; in other neurological conditions such as choreoacanthocytosis, seizures,  and Lesch–Nyhan syndrome; and rarely in persons with dementia or obsessive-compulsive disorder in the absence of tics.

Prevalence in Tourette syndrome
Only about 10% of people with Tourette's exhibit coprolalia, but it tends to attract more attention than any other symptom.

There is a paucity of epidemiological studies of Tourette syndrome; ascertainment bias affects clinical studies. Studies on people with Tourette's often "came from tertiary referral samples, the sickest of the sick".  Further, the criteria for a diagnosis of Tourette's were changed in 2000, when the impairment criterion was removed from the DSM-IV-TR for all tic disorders, resulting in increased diagnoses of milder cases. Additionally, many clinical studies suffer from small sample size. These factors combine to render older estimates of coprolalia—biased towards clinical populations of the more severe cases—outdated.

An international, multi-site database of 3,500 individuals with Tourette syndrome drawn from clinical samples found 14% of patients with Tourette's accompanied by comorbid conditions had coprolalia, while only 6% of those with uncomplicated ("pure") Tourette's had coprolalia. The same study found that the chance of having coprolalia increased linearly with the number of comorbid conditions:  patients with four or five other conditions—in addition to tics—were four to six times more likely to have coprolalia than persons with only Tourette's.

One study of a general pediatric practice found an 8% rate of coprolalia in children with Tourette syndrome, while another study found 60% in a tertiary referral center (where typically more severe cases are referred).  A more recent Brazilian study of 44 patients with Tourette syndrome found a 14% rate of coprolalia; a Costa Rican study of 85 subjects found 20% had coprolalia; a Chilean study of 70 patients found an 8.5% rate of coprolalia; older studies in Japan reported a 4% incidence of coprolalia; and a still older clinical study in Brazil found 28% of 32 patients had coprolalia. Considering the methodological issues affecting all of these reports, the consensus of the Tourette Syndrome Association is that the actual number is below 15 percent.

Management
Some patients have been treated by injecting botulinum toxin (botox) near the vocal cords. This does not prevent the vocalizations, but the partial paralysis that results helps to control the volume of any outbursts.  Botox injections result in more generalized relief of tics than the vocal relief expected.

Society and culture
The entertainment industry often depicts those with Tourette syndrome as being social misfits whose only tic is coprolalia, which has furthered stigmatization and the public's misunderstanding of those with Tourette's. The coprolalic symptoms of Tourette's are also fodder for radio and television talk shows.

See also 
 List of language disorders

References 

Profanity
Symptoms and signs: Nervous system
Tourette syndrome